Charopidae is a taxonomic family of small air-breathing land snails (and semi-slugs such as Otoconcha dimidiata), terrestrial pulmonate gastropod mollusks in the superfamily Punctoidea.

Taxonomy
The following genera are recognised in the family Charopidae:

Subfamily Charopinae
 Acanthoptyx Ancey, 1888
 Acheronopa Hyman & Stanisic, 2005
 Aeschrodomus Pilsbry, 1892
 Albiropa Holcroft & Stanisic, 2018
 Allocharopa Iredale, 1937
 Amfractaropa Holcroft, 2018
 Andrefrancia Solem, 1960
 Annoselix Iredale, 1939
 Ba Solem, 1983 - with the only species Ba humbugi 
 Barringtonica Shea, Colgan & Stanisic, 2012
 Biomphalopa Stanisic, 1990
 Bischoffena Iredale, 1937
 Burwellia Holcroft & Stanisic, 2018
 Cancellocochlea Shea, Colgan & Stanisic, 2012
 Cavellia Iredale, 1915
 Cavellioropa Dell, 1952
 Charopa E. von Martens, 1860 - type genus of the family Charopidae
 Charopella Iredale, 1944
 Chaureopa Climo, 1985
 Coenocharopa Stanisic, 1990
 Comboynea Shea, Colgan & Stanisic, 2012
 Comularopa Holcroft, 2018
 Coricudgia Hyman & Stanisic, 2005
 Corinomala Iredale, 1939
 Cralopa Iredale, 1941
 Cryptocharopa Preston, 1913
 Cumberlandica Shea, Colgan & Stanisic, 2012
 Danielleilona Stanisic, 1993
 Decoriropa Hyman & Stanisic, 2005
 Dentherona Iredale, 1933
 Dictyoropa Shea, Colgan & Stanisic, 2012
 Diphyoropa Hyman & Stanisic, 2005
 Dipnelix Iredale, 1937
 Discocharopa Iredale, 1913
 Dividospiralia Stanisic, 2010
 Dupucharopa Iredale, 1937
 Egestula Iredale, 1915
 Egilodonta Iredale, 1937
 Egilomen Iredale, 1937
 Elsothera Iredale, 1933
 Epinicium Iredale, 1939
 Eungellaropa Holcroft & Stanisic, 2018
 Excaliburopa Stanisic, 2010
 Fectola Iredale, 1915
 Frustropa Iredale, 1945
 Geminoropa Kershaw, 1955
 Gerontia Hutton, 1882
 Gouldiropa Hyman & Stanisic, 2005
 Goweroconcha Iredale, 1944
 Graeffedon Solem, 1983
 Groveiana Stanisic, 2018
 Gyrocochlea Hedley, 1924
 Gyropena Iredale, 1944
 Hedleyoconcha Pilsbry, 1893
 Hedleyropa Hyman & Stanisic, 2005
 Hirsutaropa Holcroft & Stanisic, 2018
 Huntiana Stanisic, 2018
 Hyaloropa Stanisic, 2018
 Insularopa Stanisic, 2018
 Insullaoma Iredale, 1937
 Isolderopa Stanisic, 2010
 Kannaropa Iredale, 1937
 Kermodon Iredale, 1945
 Koreelahropa Stanisic, 2010
 Kosciuszkoropa Stanisic, 2018
 Lacuropa Stanisic, 2018
 Lagivala Solem, 1983
 Lauopa Solem, 1983
 Lenwebbia Stanisic, 1990
 Letomola Iredale, 1941
 Leurocochlea Stanisic, 2010
 Luinodiscus Iredale, 1937
 Luturopa Stanisic, 2010
 Maafu Solem, 1983
 Macleayropa Stanisic, 2010
 Macphersonea Shea, Colgan & Stanisic, 2012
 Macrophallikoropa Hyman & Stanisic, 2005
 Marilyniropa Hyman & Stanisic, 2005
 Meredithena Stanisic, 2018
 Metaropa Stanisic, 2018
 Micromphalia Ancey, 1882
 Minutiropa Stanisic, 2018
 Mocella Iredale, 1915
 Monomphalus Ancey, 1882
 Mulathena B. J. Smith & Kershaw, 1985
 Mussonula Iredale, 1937
 Mystivagor Iredale, 1944
 Nanoropa Stanisic, 2018
 Nautiliropa Stanisic, 1990
 Neoparyphantopsis Miquel & Araya, 2015
 Ngairea Stanisic, 1990
 Nodularopa Holcroft, 2018
 Norfolcioconcha Preston, 1913
 Notodiscus Thiele, 1931
 Nullarboropa Stanisic, 2018
 Omphaloropa Stanisic, 1990
 Oreokera Stanisic, 1987
 Oreomava Kershaw, 1956
 Papulaoma Iredale, 1941
 Paracharopa Climo, 1983
 Pararhytida Ancey, 1882
 Paratrochus Pilsbry, 1893
 Parvicharopa Solem, 1958
 Paryphantopsis Thiele, 1928
 Penescosta Iredale, 1944
 Pereduropa Stanisic, 2010
 Pernagera Iredale, 1939
 Phenacharopa Pilsbry, 1893
 Pillomena Iredale, 1937
 Planilaoma Iredale, 1937
 Planorbacochlea Shea, Colgan & Stanisic, 2012
 Platyrhytida Cockerell, 1895
 Plesiopsis Ancey, 1888
 Protractiropa Stanisic, 2018
 Pseudegestula Dell, 1954
 Pseudocharopa Peile, 1929
 Pulcharopa Iredale, 1944
 Pulchridomus Climo, 1980
 Radiolaropa Holcroft, 2018
 Reticharopa Solem, 1959
 Rhophodon Hedley, 1924
 Rhytidopsis Ancey, 1882
 Richardsoniana Stanisic, 2010
 Richmondaropa Shea, Colgan & Stanisic, 2012
 Robinsoniana Stanisic, 2018
 Roblinella Iredale, 1937
 Scelidoropa Hyman & Stanisic, 2005
 Setomedea Iredale, 1941
 Setoturbinata Stanisic, 2010
 Sharniropa Hyman & Stanisic, 2005
 Shearopa Stanisic, 2010
 Sinployea Solem, 1983
 Spiraliropa Stanisic, 2010
 Stanisicaropa Holcroft, 2018
 Stenacapha B. J. Smith & Kershaw, 1985
 Suteria Pilsbry, 1892
 Tasmanoropa Bonham, 2018
 Tasmathera Bonham, 2018
 Tateropa Stanisic, 2018
 Teracharopa Maassen, 2000
 Therasiella Powell, 1948
 Thryasona B. J. Smith & Kershaw, 1985
 Tristanoropa Holcroft, 2018
 Tropidotropis Ancey, 1888
 Tuimalila Solem, 1983
 Vatusila Solem, 1983
 Whissonia Stanisic, 2018
 Whitcochlea Holcroft, 2018
 Whiteheadia Hyman & Stanisic, 2005 
 Xenoropa Holcroft, 2018
 Ygernaropa Stanisic, 2010

Subfamily Flammoconchinae
 Calymna Hutton, 1883
 Flammoconcha Dell, 1952 - type genus of the subfamily Flammoconchinae

Subfamily Flammulininae
 Amphidoxa Albers, 1850
 Flammulina E. von Martens, 1873
 Flammulops Iredale, 1937
 Montaropa Climo, 1984
 Protoflammulina Climo, 1971

Subfamily Otoconchinae
 Maoriconcha Dell, 1952
 Otoconcha Hutton, 1884 - type genus of the subfamily Otoconchinae

Subfamily Phenacohelicinae
 Allodiscus Pilsbry, 1892
 Canallodiscus B. A. Marshall & Barker, 2008
 Costallodiscus B. A. Marshall & Barker, 2008
 Granallodiscus B. A. Marshall & Barker, 2008
 Hirsutodiscus Climo, 1971
 Neophenacohelix Cumber, 1961
 Phenacohelix Suter, 1892
 Pseudallodiscus Climo, 1971

Subfamily Ranfurlyinae
 Ranfurlya Suter, 1903 - type genus of the subfamily Ranfurlyinae

Subfamily Rotadiscinae
 Alsolemia Climo, 1981
 Damonita Climo, 1981
 Helenoconcha Pilsbry, 1892
 Huonodon Iredale, 1945
 Loisthodon Climo, 1989
 Microcharopa Solem, 1983
 Missioclivus Iredale, 1941
 Mitodon Climo, 1989
 Ptychodon Ancey, 1888
 Radioconus H. B. Baker, 1927
 Radiodiscus Pilsbry, 1906
 Radiodomus H. B. Baker, 1930
 Rotacharopa Stanisic, 1990

 Rotadiscus Pilsbry, 1926 - type genus of the subfamily Rotadiscinae
 Zelandiscus Climo, 1989

Subfamily Semperdoninae
 Himeroconcha Solem, 1983
 Landronellum Solem, 1983
 Semperdon Solem, 1983 - type genus of the subfamily Semperdoninae

Subfamily Therasiinae
 Phacussa Hutton, 1883
 Serpho Hutton, 1904
 Thalassohelix Pilsbry, 1892
 Therasia Hutton, 1883
 Thermia Hutton, 1904

Subfamily Thysanotinae
 Fametesta Pilsbry, 1902
 Glyptaulax Gude, 1914
 Hirasea Pilsbry, 1902
 Hirasiella Pilsbry, 1902
 Philalanka Godwin-Austen, 1898
 Ruthvenia Gude, 1911
 Tadaia Minato & Okubo, 1992
 Thysanota E. von Martens, 1860 - type genus of the subfamily Thysanotinae

Subfamily Trachycystinae
 Araucocharopa Miquel & Cádiz Lorca, 2008
 Austrodiscus Parodiz, 1957
 Chalcocystis H. Watson, 1934
 Chellius Vargas-Almonacid & Stuardo, 2007
 Chilocystis H. Watson, 1934
 Cyclocystis H. Watson, 1934
 Dendrotrichia van Bruggen & Verdcourt, 1965
 Glabrogyra Müller da Fonseca & Thomé, 1993
 Helenodiscus Solem, 1977
 Lilloiconcha Weyrauch, 1965
 Liparocystis H. Watson, 1934
 Lyrocystis H. Watson, 1934
 Payenia J. Mabille & Rochebrune, 1889
 Phaulocystis H. Watson, 1934
 Phortion Preston, 1910
 Pilula E. von Martens, 1898
 Propilula Germain, 1918
 Prositala Germain, 1915
 Pseudohelenoconcha Zilch, 1959
 Psichion Gude, 1911
 Reticulapex Emberton & Pearce, 2000
 Stephacharopa Miquel & Araya, 2013
 Stephadiscus Hylton Scott, 1981
 Stephanoda E. von Martens, 1860
 Trachycystis Pilsbry, 1893 - type genus of the subfamily Trachycystinae
 Xerocystis H. Watson, 1934
 Zilchogyra Weyrauch, 1965

Subfamily Trukcharopinae
 Jokajdon Solem, 1983
 Kubaryiellus Solem, 1983
 Palikirus Solem, 1983
 Palline Solem, 1983
 Roimontis Solem, 1983
 Russatus Solem, 1983
 Trukcharopa Solem, 1983 - type genus of the subfamily Trukcharopinae

Incerta sedis
 Afrodonta Melvill & Ponsonby, 1908
 Alpiniropa Stanisic, 2018
 Ammoniropa Bonham, 2018
 Archiropa Bonham, 2018
 Austellorien Stanisic, 2018
 Banjoropa Stanisic, 2018
 Biomphalodonta Herbert, 2018
 Bonhamaropa Stanisic, 2018
 Chordaropa Stanisic, 2016
 Climocella Goulstone, 1996
 †Colhueconus Miquel & Bellosi, 2010
 Costulodonta Herbert, 2020
 Dendropa Marshall & Worthy, 2017
 Diemenoropa Bonham, 2018
 Exquisitiropa Stanisic, 2018
 Gadoropa Bonham, 2018
 Iterodonta Herbert, 2020
 Kessneropa Bonham, 2018
 Lithocouperia Stanisic, 2016
 Lorelleia Stanisic, 2018
 Lottaropa Bonham, 2018
 † Patagocharopa Miquel & P. E. Rodriguez, 2016
 Phialodonta Herbert, 2020
 Reticularopa Stanisic, 2016

References

External links